Music City Mall is a regional shopping mall located in Odessa, Texas that originally opened in 1980 as the Permian Mall.  The mall itself houses over 100 businesses and used to have the only ice skating facility within , the MCM Ice Skating Facility was replaced by a Rollerskate rink in 2021 because a part of the rink was damaged beyond repair. The mall has a gross leasable area of 750,000 square feet (70,000 m2). The anchor stores are At Home, Burke's Outlet, Burlington Coat Factory, Dillard's, and JCPenney.

The mall also houses the location for CBS affiliate KOSA-TV, which moved here after its purchase in 2000.

References

External links
 Official site

Shopping malls in Texas
Shopping malls established in 1980
Buildings and structures in Ector County, Texas
Tourist attractions in Ector County, Texas